John Borozzi is a retired American soccer player who played in the North American Soccer League and Major Indoor Soccer League.  He later served in a variety of executive positions both at the team and league levels with MISL and Major League Soccer.

Player

Youth
In 1972, Borozzi graduated from Dundalk High School where he had led his school's soccer team to two state championships, scoring 54 career goals.  He attended the University of Pennsylvania where he played on the men's soccer team from 1974 to 1975.  In 1974, he was First Team All Ivy.  In 1975, he was chosen to play for the U.S. Olympic team as it prepared for qualifications for the 1976 Summer Olympics.  His commitments to the Olympic team eventually led Borozzi to drop out of Penn as a senior.  He completed his undergraduate degree in 1988 from Towson State.

Professional
In 1976, Borozzi signed with the Philadelphia Atoms of the North American Soccer League.  The team folded at the end of the season, and he signed as a free agent with the Washington Diplomats.  He was an unused substitute for the 1977 season and was released a month into the 1978 season.  He played eight games for the Baltimore Blast of Major Indoor Soccer League during the 1980-1981 season.

Management
In August 1990, the Blast hired Borozzi as the team's general manager after the previous GM, Stan White, had resigned.   In September 1991, he became the deputy commissioner of the Major Soccer League.  In February 1993, he joined the Baltimore Bays of USISL as its youth soccer director.  In September 1995, the Columbus Crew of Major League Soccer hired Borozzi as its marketing director.  In 1998, he moved to the Miami Fusion where he worked in various positions in sales and marketing.

He was inducted into the Maryland Soccer Hall of Fame in 1995.

References

External links
 Philadelphia Atoms roster
 NASL/MISL stats

1954 births
Living people
Soccer players from Baltimore
American soccer coaches
American soccer players
Baltimore Blast (1980–1992) players
Major Indoor Soccer League (1978–1992) players
North American Soccer League (1968–1984) players
Penn Quakers men's soccer players
Philadelphia Atoms players
Towson University alumni
Association football forwards
Association football midfielders